Lindbergh is an unincorporated community in Columbia County, Oregon, United States.

References

Unincorporated communities in Columbia County, Oregon
Oregon populated places on the Columbia River
Unincorporated communities in Oregon